Clathrina blanca is a species of calcareous sponge. It was originally named by Nicholas Miklouho-Maclay in tribute to the Guanches, the original inhabitants of the Canary Islands who had been exterminated by European invaders.

Notes and references 

Animals described in 1868
Fauna of Russia
Fauna of the Canary Islands
Fauna of Sweden